Sally Brown is a fictional character in the comic strip Peanuts by Charles Schulz.

Sally Brown may also refer to:

Sally Boynton Brown (born 1975/1976), American political strategist
Sally Brown (horse) (1982–2000), British Thoroughbred racehorse and broodmare
Sally Brown (athlete) (born 1995), Paralympian athlete from Northern Ireland